The Dude Wrangler is a 1930 American pre-Code comedy Western film directed by Richard Thorpe and starring Lina Basquette, Tom Keene and Clyde Cook.

Cast
 Lina Basquette as Helen Dane 
 Tom Keene as Wally McCann (credited as George Duryea)
 Clyde Cook as Pinkey Fripp 
 Francis X. Bushman as Canby 
 Ethel Wales as Mattie 
 Margaret Seddon as Aunt Mary 
 Sôjin Kamiyama as Wong 
 Wilfrid North as The 'Snorer'

References

Bibliography
 Pitts, Michael R. Poverty Row Studios, 1929–1940: An Illustrated History of 55 Independent Film Companies, with a Filmography for Each. McFarland & Company, 2005.

External links
 

1930 films
1930s Western (genre) comedy films
1930s English-language films
American Western (genre) comedy films
Films directed by Richard Thorpe
American black-and-white films
1930 comedy films
1930s American films